The Tukahe Dam (土卡河) is a gravity dam on the Lixian River, bordering the counties of Luchun and Jiangcheng in Yunnan Province, China. The primary purpose of the dam is hydroelectric power generation and it supports a 165 MW power station. Construction began in 2003 and in 2008 the three 55 MW generators were commissioned. It is the last in a cascade of seven dams on the Lixian.

See also

List of dams and reservoirs in China
List of major power stations in Yunnan

References

Dams in China
Hydroelectric power stations in Yunnan
Gravity dams
Dams completed in 2008
Dams on the Black River (Asia)
Roller-compacted concrete dams
Buildings and structures in Pu'er
Buildings and structures in Honghe Hani and Yi Autonomous Prefecture